The Jackson Southernaires is an American traditional black gospel music group from Jackson, Mississippi, producer Frank Crisler formed the group in 1940, yet they did not become active until 1969, with the release of Too Late by Song Bird Records. At its inception, The group consisted of five members; Huey Williams, Roger Bryant Jr., Maurice Surrell, James Burks, and Luther Jennings. The group received a nomination for a Grammy Award in the Best Traditional Gospel Album category at the 34th Annual Grammy Awards. The group has released 28 albums, including their 2010 release, Back Again, with Blackberry Records. Eleven albums have charted on the Billboard magazine charts, only on the Gospel Albums chart.

Background
The Jackson, Mississippi-based traditional black gospel group, The Jackson Southernaires was founded by record producer, Frank Crisler, in 1940. They did not start actively recording and releasing music until 1969. The group at its inception included Huey Williams, Roger Bryant Jr., Maurice Surrell, James Burks, and Luther Jennings, Dr. Gary Miles, Granard McClendon, Melvin Wilson.

History
The group has released 28 albums from 1969 until 2010, with the following labels: Song Bird Records, Malaco Records, MCA Records, Redemption Records,  and Blackberry Records. Of these albums, eleven charted on the Billboard magazine Gospel Albums chart, and those were, Made in Mississippi, Greatest Hits, Lord We Need Your Blessing, Hear Our Prayers O Lord, Power Packed, On the Third Day, Thank You Mama for Praying for Me, Live and Anointed, The Word in Song, The Brothers Dream...Alive, and Warrior. The group received a Grammy Award nomination for the Best Traditional Gospel Album at the 34th Annual Grammy Awards, for the album Thank You Mama for Praying for Me.

Members
Current
 Huey Williams
 Maurice Surrell
 James Burks

Former
 Willie Banks (deceased)
 Roger Bryant Jr. (deceased)
 Luther Jennings (deceased)
 Rev. Charles E. Polk Sr. (deceased)
 Frank Delano Williams (deceased)
 Plathell Paul  Peters (deceased)

Discography
(*) – Denotes a Grammy Award nomination, for that particular album

References

Further reading

External links
 Malaco Records profile

Musical groups established in 1940